Blake Koch (born August 7, 1985) is an American professional stock car racing driver and businessman. He last competed in the NASCAR Xfinity Series, driving the No. 11 Chevrolet Camaro for Kaulig Racing. He is also the founder of FilterTime, a residential air filter company that delivers the filters to consumer's homes on a regular basis.

Racing career

Koch began his racing career at the age of 22 after he graduated from college with an associate degree in Marketing and Business Degree at Northwood University. Prior to racing on 4 wheels, Koch raced on 2 wheels and was considered one of the top 20 motorcross riders in the state of Florida. Koch raced 8 years until the end of 2008 when he made the transition to NASCAR. In 2009, he started racing in the NASCAR Camping World West Series. He finished 8th in the final point  standings and finished runner up in the Rookie of the Year standings. In 2011, he made his 1st Nationwide Series race at Phoenix and finished 17th and on the lead lap. He earned 4 top 20 finishes in 2011 and finished 18th in the final point standings.

Koch planned to compete for Rick Ware Racing in the 2012 Nationwide Series driving the No. 41. Partway through the season Koch was switched to the No. 15 when Timmy Hill returned to Nationwide competition, and soon afterwards was forced to switch to a limited schedule due to a lack of sponsorship. Koch lost the sponsor after the accompanying ESPN ad campaign was denied for "political and religious overtones".

For 2013, Koch could not find a full-time ride, and was forced to start-and-park for SR² Motorsports, for which he had driven a limited start-and-park schedule late in 2012. Koch ran most of the season in the team's No. 24 and No. 00 Toyotas. The team ran full races on occasion. In October, he made his debut in the Sprint Cup Series, driving for Leavine Family Racing at Charlotte Motor Speedway.

Later in 2013, Koch finally caught a break, landing a ride with RAB Racing in the Nationwide Series finale at Homestead-Miami Speedway, where he started on the outside pole.

However, again unable to find a full-time ride, Koch moved to TriStar Motorsports for the  2014 NASCAR Nationwide Series season, for the most part running the team's start-and-park entries which help fund TriStar's full-time teams. He also signed with Front Row Motorsports to drive the No. 35 Ford in the Sprint Cup Series for a limited schedule of races.  He also ran a handful of races for Go FAS Racing as well.

In 2015, Koch was finally given a full-time ride by TriStar Motorsports for the full Xfinity Series (formerly Nationwide Series) in the No. 8 Toyota with LeafFilter Gutter Protection as a primary sponsor. Koch was leading with 6 laps to go in Road America when the battery died, resulting in a 20th-place finish. After the race Koch described the race as the closest he had come to winning in his entire career.

In 2016, LeafFilter owner Matt Kaulig left TriStar to start his own team, Kaulig Racing, with an alliance with Richard Childress Racing. Koch came over as well, running the full season in the No. 11 LeafFilter Gutter Protection Chevrolet. Koch finished 9th at the season opener at Daytona, his first top-ten of his career. Koch went on to have the best season of his career, scoring five top-10s and qualifying for the inaugural Xfinity Series playoffs. Koch would finish 7th in points, by far his best career NASCAR performance.

In 2017, Koch returned to Kaulig Racing for another full-time Xfinity season with LeafFilter.

On January 9, 2018, it was announced that Ryan Truex would take over Koch's No. 11 ride. Koch knew in the later stages of December that LeafFilter would not return in a large role and that he needed to find sponsorship to stay with the team. Kaulig has stated that he would like to retain Koch in a second car dependent on sponsorship. Koch has stated that he has been contacted by teams in all three of NASCAR's national series and that he would be content with a full or part-time ride in any of those series. He instead served as a driver coach for Matt Tifft and as an analyst for the "Blake's Take" segment of NASCAR Race Hub.

After not driving at all in 2018, on December 4, Koch announced he would be joining JD Motorsports in their No. 4 entry in the Xfinity Series in 2019, left vacant by Ross Chastain. Koch's company FilterTime was announced as a sponsor of the team. On January 31, 2019, Koch stepped down from the ride to focus on his FilterTime business after it was announced that Chastain was returning to the team. Koch continued his driver coaching in 2019, working with Harrison Burton.

Personal life
Born in West Palm Beach, Florida, Koch currently resides in Huntersville, North Carolina with his wife Shannon and their son, Carter and daughter, Bailey.

Koch is a Christian. Koch has spoken about his faith saying, "[God has] given me this platform that people listen to me and I feel like I have a great opportunity to tell people about Jesus through that."

Koch appeared in a commercial for the voting awareness organization Rise Up and Register; however, it was rejected by ESPN due to "religious and political overtones"; despite there being no religious messages in the commercial. ESPN later issued a statement saying, "Koch’s personal religious beliefs played no role in our evaluation."

Koch is the founder and owner of FilterTime, a residential air filter delivery service. The business was founded in 2017 after losing his ride with Kaulig Racing, formed for the purpose of funding his racing career. Dale Earnhardt Jr. became a partner in the company in April 2019.

Motorsports career results

NASCAR
(key) (Bold – Pole position awarded by qualifying time. Italics – Pole position earned by points standings or practice time. * – Most laps led.)

Sprint Cup Series

Xfinity Series

Camping World Truck Series

K&N Pro Series West

ARCA Racing Series
(key) (Bold – Pole position awarded by qualifying time. Italics – Pole position earned by points standings or practice time. * – Most laps led.)

 Season still in progress
 Ineligible for series points

References

External links

 
 

Living people
1985 births
Sportspeople from West Palm Beach, Florida
Racing drivers from Florida
Racing drivers from Miami
NASCAR drivers
ARCA Menards Series drivers
Northwood University alumni
People from Huntersville, North Carolina